Hadrian's Villa is a UNESCO World Heritage Site comprising the ruins and archaeological remains of a large villa complex built c. AD 120 by Roman Emperor Hadrian at Tivoli outside Rome. The site is owned by the Republic of Italy and has been managed since 2014 by the Polo Museale del Lazio.

History 

The villa was constructed near Tibur (modern-day Tivoli) as a retreat from Rome for Emperor Hadrian during the second and third decades of the 2nd century AD. Hadrian is said to have disliked the palace on the Palatine Hill in Rome, leading to the construction of the retreat. It was traditional for the Roman emperor to have constructed a villa as a place to relax from everyday life. Previous emperors and Romans with wealth had also constructed villas (e.g. Villa of Trajan). Though emperors’ villas were supposed to be a place of rest and leisure, there is some evidence of Hadrian conducting official duty from the villa in the form of an inscription of an official letter sent from the villa in the summer of 125 AD.

The picturesque landscape around Tibur had made the area a popular choice for villas and rural retreats. It was reputed to have been popular with people from the Spanish peninsula who were residents in the city of Rome. This may have contributed to Hadrian's choice of the property: although born in Rome, his parents came from Spain and he may have become familiar with the area during his early life. There may have also been a connection through his wife Vibia Sabina (83–136/137), who was the niece of the Emperor Trajan. Sabina's family held large land holdings and it is speculated the Tibur property may have been one of them. A villa from the Republican era formed the basis for Hadrian's establishment.. Hadrian begun construction on the villa early into his career as emperor, though brick stamp evidence shows us that construction of the villa was ongoing.

During the later years of his reign, Hadrian governed the empire from the villa. He started using the villa as his official residence around AD 128. Therefore, a large court lived there permanently and large numbers of visitors and bureaucrats would have to have been entertained and housed temporarily on site.

After Hadrian, the villa was used occasionally by his various successors (busts of Antoninus Pius (138–161), Marcus Aurelius (161–180), Lucius Verus (161–169), Septimius Severus and Caracalla have been found on the premises). Zenobia, the deposed queen of Palmyra, lived near the villa from 273 until her passing. The villa was restored by Diocletian during the final decades of the third century.

During the decline of the Roman Empire in the 4th century, the villa gradually fell into disuse and was partially ruined as valuable statues and marble were taken away by Constantine the Great and his successors. The facility was used as a warehouse by both sides during the destructive Gothic War (535–554) between the Ostrogoths and Byzantines. Remains of lime kilns have been found, where marble from the complex was burned to extract lime for building material. Building material was also reused by the Christians to build basilicas and other buildings.

The first documented rediscovery of the Villa was by Historian Biondo Flavio in the late 15th century who brought its attention to Pope Pius II whose writings on the villa in his Comeratti began to pique architectural interest in the Villa. In the 16th century, Cardinal Ippolito II d'Este had much of the remaining marble and statues in Hadrian's Villa removed to decorate his own Villa d'Este located nearby. Since that period, excavations have sporadically turned up more fragments and sculptures, some of which have been kept in situ or housed on site in the display buildings.

Structure and architecture 

Hadrian's Villa is a vast area of land with many pools, baths, fountains and classical Greek and Roman architecture set in what would have been a mixture of landscaped gardens, wilderness areas and cultivated farmlands. Due to Hadrian's travels, he also commissioned Egyptian style buildings and statues, even naming some of the buildings after Egyptian cities or temples. 

The buildings are constructed in travertine, brick, lime, pozzolana, and tufa. The complex contains over 30 buildings, covering at least a square kilometre (250 acres, an area larger than the city of Pompeii), of which much is still unexcavated. Villas were typically sited on hilltops, but with its fountains, pools and gardens, Hadrian's villa required abundant sources of water, which was supplied by aqueducts feeding Rome, including the Aqua Anio Vetus, Aqua Anio Novus, Aqua Marcia, and Aqua Claudia. To avail themselves of those sources, the villa had to be located on land lower than the aqueduct.

The complex of the villa contains many structures from different cultures. For example, the villa has a small Nile River running through it that relates back to the Egyptian Nile river. Also, the villa had Poikilos, which are Greek figures that were seen in ancient Greece. Written evidence we have of Hadrian’s Villa in ancient writing is from the Historia Augusta, which describes how Hadrian named rooms of the villa after various significant locations within the Roman Empire (the Lyceum, the Academy, Hades) and these continue today to be the terms scholars use to describe sections of the villa.

The architecture goes beyond the mere naming of its structures after places and monuments seen by Hadrian on his extensive travels across the empire. Certain buildings clearly attempt to recreate specific features of landscapes or architecture that had personal significance for the emperor. Thus, the area known as the Canopus, named after the Egyptian city and a section of the Nile which leads to the city, features a long, stately reflecting pool representing the Nile. This area's sculptural program is the most complete including copies of famous sculptures including the caryatids of the Erechtheion, a statue depicting the Egyptian dwarf and fertility god Bes, and a crocodile. The Pecile is modeled after the Stoa Poikile in Athens, a city favored by Hadrian. The structures freely mix traditional Greek and innovative Roman elements. The island enclosure (known as the Maritime Theatre) uses the classical Ionic order, albeit in a novel way; the triclinium of the so-called Piazza d’Oro and the Serapeum were covered with Roman segmented concrete domes, probably designed by Hadrian himself.

Hadrian's Pecile located inside the Villa was a huge garden surrounded by a swimming pool and an arcade. The pool's dimensions measure . Originally, the pool was surrounded by four walls with colonnaded interior. These columns helped to support the roof. In the center of the quadriportico was a large rectangular pool. The four walls create a peaceful solitude for Hadrian and guests.

One structure in the villa is the so-called "Maritime Theatre". It consists of a round portico with a barrel vault supported by pillars. Inside the portico was a ring-shaped pool with a central island. The large circular enclosure  in diameter has an entrance to the north. Inside the outer wall and surrounding the moat are a ring of unfluted Ionic columns. The Maritime Theater includes a lounge, a library, heated baths, three suites with heated floors, washbasin, an art gallery, and a large fountain. During the ancient times, the island was connected to the portico by two wooden drawbridges. On the island sits a small domus, complete with an atrium, a library, a triclinium, and small baths. The area was probably used by the emperor as a retreat from the busy life at the court.

The villa utilizes numerous architectural styles and innovations. The domes of the steam baths have circular holes on the apex to allow steam to escape. This is reminiscent of the Pantheon, also built by Hadrian. The area has a network of tunnels and were mostly used to transport servants and goods from one area to another.

The Antinoeion 
In 1998 a new section of the Villa, named by scholars the Antinoeion, was rediscovered.This area is located on the main road leading to the grand vestibule. The discovery of a large concrete foundation has been used as evidence of the original location of the Antonius Obelisk which is now located on the Pincian Hill in Rome. Some Scholars have argued that this evidence is proof of Antonius’s tomb being located on the Villa. This has been challenged by scholars who argue that the area instead was a highly Egyptianized nypheum. The Antinoeion is just one example of Egyptianization of the Villa. Artwork such as the crocodile of the Canopus and the statue of Osiris-Antinous show the prevalence of this orientalist aesthetic in the villa. 

In September 2013, a network of tunnels was investigated, buried deep beneath the villa; these were probably service routes for staff so that the idyllic nature of the landscape might remain undisturbed. The site housed several thousand people including staff, visitors, servants and slaves. Although much major activity would have been engaged in during Hadrian's absence on tours of inspection of the provinces a great many people (and animals) must have been moving about the Tivoli site on a daily basis.

Sculptures and artworks 

Many beautiful artifacts have been unearthed and restored at the Villa, such as marble statues of Antinous, Hadrian's deified lover, accidentally drowned in Egypt, and mosaics from the theatre and baths.

A lifelike mosaic depicted a group of doves around a bowl, with one drinking, seems to be a copy of a work by Sosus of Pergamon as described by Pliny the Elder.  It has in turn been widely copied.

Many copies of Greek statues (such as the Wounded Amazon) have been found, and even Egyptian-style interpretations of Roman gods and vice versa. Most of these have been taken to Rome for preservation and restoration, and can be seen at the Musei Capitolini or the Musei Vaticani.  However, many were also excavated in the 18th century by antiquities dealers such as Piranesi and Gavin Hamilton to sell to Grand Tourists and antiquarians such as Charles Towneley, and so are in major antiquities collections elsewhere in Europe and North America.  

Artworks found in the villa include:

 Statue of Osiris-Antinous, Vatican Museum 

Discobolus
Dove Basin mosaic, copy of a famous Hellenistic mosaic, Capitoline Museums
Diana of Versailles, Louvre
Crouching Venus
Capitoline Antinous
Young Centaur and Old Centaur (Capitoline versions)

Present-day significance 
The United Nations Educational, Scientific and Cultural Organization (UNESCO) designated Hadrian's Villa as a World Heritage Site in 1999. The designation specified the boundaries of the site and created a buffer zone around it in which no new construction was permitted. In 2011, the communal government of Tivoli announced plans, later cancelled, to build a waste dump in the vicinity of the villa and approved the construction of public housing on 120,000 sq. meters within the buffer zone. At its 36th Annual Meeting, UNESCO formally addressed these encroachments on the site. While they commended the Italian government for its decision to abandon the construction of a waste dump in the Corcolle area, the committee requested the government “to inform the World Heritage Centre in due time about any major development project planned in the buffer zone of the property, including the housing development at Comprensorio di Ponte Lucano, for which a Heritage Impact Assessment should be included, in accordance with Paragraph 172 of the Operational Guidelines, before any irreversible commitment is made.” UNESCO also requested “the State Party to submit . . . an updated report on the state of conservation of the property,” by February 2014, reflecting concerns over the deterioration of the exposed ruins. 

The reasons for making the villa a World Heritage Site are: it is a masterpiece that brings together the material culture of the Mediterranean world, it inspired the Renaissance and baroque period, it inspires the modern world as well, and the villa is an exceptional survival of the early Roman Empire.

In 2016, as part of the reorganization of the Ministero per i Beni e le Attività Culturali, Hadrian's Villa, the neighboring Villa d’Este and the Temple of Hercules in Tivoli were placed under the supervision of the newly-created Istituto Autonomo di Villa Adriana.

The Accademia Adrianea di Architettura ed Archeologia1 issued a call for papers for a conference titled Designing the UNESCO Buffer Aobe.

The Academy of the villa was placed on the 100 Most Endangered Sites 2006 list of the World Monuments Watch because of the rapid deterioration of the ruins.

In 2019, UNESCO designated Hadrian's Villa as a site with special immunity from wartime activity due to its profound symbolic value. This added level of security prohibits U.N. members from attacking the site or using it for military purposes in the event of a war.

In 2021 February, archaeologists led by researcher Rafael Hidalgo Prieto from the Pablo de Olavide University announced the discovery of remains of Hadrian's breakfast room which used to show his imperial power. They revealed a structure as a water triclinium and a separate dining room that served as a model for the well-known Serapeum.

“The emperor wanted to show things that would overwhelm the visitor, something that had not been seen anywhere else in the world and that exists only in Villa Adriana” said Prieto.

Gallery

See also 
List of Roman domes
History of Roman and Byzantine domes
Villa Romana del Casale ruins of a Roman senators villa

References

Further reading 
 A. Betori, Z. Mari, 'Villa Adriana, edificio circolare noto come Sepolcro o Tomba: campagna di scavo 2004: breve sintesi dei resultati', in Journal of Fasti Online, www.fastionline.org/docs/2004-14.pdf
 Hadrien empereur et architecte. La Villa d'Hadrien: tradition et modernite d'un paysage culturel. Actes du Colloque international organise  par le Centre Culturel du Pantheon (2002. Geneva)
 Villa Adriana. Paesaggio antico e ambiente moderno: elementi di novita` e ricerche in corso. Atti del Convegno: Roma 23–24 giugnio 2000, ed. A. M. Reggiani (2002. Milan)
 E. Salza Prina Ricotti, Villa Adriana il sogno di un imperatore (2001)
 Hadrien: tresor d'une villa imperiale, ed. J. Charles-Gaffiot, H. Lavagne [exhibition catalogue, Paris] (1999. Milan)
 W. L. MacDonald and J. A. Pinto, Hadrian's Villa and its legacy (1995)
 A. Giubilei, 'Il Conte Fede e la Villa Adriana: storia di una collezione d'arte', in Atti e Memorie della Società Tiburtina di Storia e d'arte; 68 (1995), p. 81–121
 J. Raeder, Die Statuarische Ausstattung Der Villa Hadriana Bei Tivoli (1983)
 R. Lanciani, La Villa Adriana (1906)

External links 

Digital Hadrian's Villa Project
UNESCO: Villa Adriana (Tivoli)
Tivoli - Hadrian's Villa

Houses completed in the 2nd century
Ancient Roman buildings and structures in Italy
Archaeological museums in Italy
Buildings and structures in Lazio
Villa
Hadrianic building projects
Museums in Lazio
Museums of ancient Rome in Italy
Open-air museums in Italy
Roman villas in Italy
Tivoli, Lazio
Tourist attractions in Lazio
World Heritage Sites in Italy
Archaeological sites in Lazio
National museums of Italy
Lime kilns in Italy